The following is a list of lakes of Mexico.

Chihuahua
Lakes las chivas

Durango
Lake Palmito 
Lake Santiaguillo

Jalisco
Lake Chapala (also in Michoacán)
Lake Sayula
Lake Cajititlán
Lake San Marcos
Lake Atotonilco

Mexico City
Lake Xochimilco
Lake Cico
Lake Cacho 
Lake Ceko

Michoacán
Lake Cuitzeo 
Lake Pátzcuaro
Lake Zirahuén

Nayarit
Lake Agua Milpa

Nuevo León
Lake Cerro Prieto 
Lake Cuchillo
Lake marychivas

Puebla
Lake Alchichica
Lake Aljojuca
Lake Atexcac
Lake La Preciosa
Lake Quechulac
Lake Tecuitlapa
Lake Tepeyahualco
Lake Totolcinco

Quintana Roo
Lake Bacalar 
Lake Chichancanab

Sinaloa
Lake Baccarac
Lake Comedero
Lake Dominguez 
Lake Hidalgo 
Lake Huites 
Lake Mateos  
Lake Salto

Tamaulipas
Lake Guerrero

Veracruz
Lake Catemaco

Uncategorized
Lake Espanolia 
Lake Lavaderosa
Lake Méndezi
Lake Mimbresa
Lake Mocuzaria
Laguna Tortugaio

See also

List of lakes

Mexico
Lakes